Thomas Liao (22 March 1910 – 9 May 1986) was a Taiwanese independence activist and founding leader of the Republic of Taiwan Provisional Government.

Biography 
Thomas Liao was born in present-day Xiluo, Yunlin County, on 22 March 1910, to a wealthy Presbyterian family of Hakka descent. Liao finished his secondary education in Kyoto, Japan, then enrolled at the University of Nanking to study mechanical engineering. Liao earned graduate degrees in the United States, completing a master's at the University of Michigan and a doctorate in chemical engineering at Ohio State University. He married an American, and his children were raised in the United States. After obtaining his Ph.D in 1935, Liao taught at National Chekiang University. Soon after the Second Sino-Japanese War began, Liao joined the National Revolutionary Army Ordnance Corps with the rank of colonel.

Liao returned to Taiwan in 1940, and became a businessman. In 1945, he began working for the Kuomintang within Taipei City Government, as director of the municipal bus system and the city's Public Works Bureau. Free China Review reported that Liao tied with three other candidates after one of his votes was invalidated due to the presence of an "ink stain." Liao lost after lots were drawn.

Thomas and his elder brother  pushed for Taiwan to be governed by "effective constitutional administration" in 1946, and by January 1947, Thomas had written about a Federated States of China, in which Taiwan was granted full autonomy. Constitutionalism was a tenet of his campaign. George H. Kerr wrote in Formosa Betrayed that the Kuomintang nullified his election because "too many Liao ballots were marked with "imperfect calligraphy." Liao left for Hong Kong later that year, after his brother had been arrested in the aftermath of the 228 Incident. Liao and  founded the Formosan League for Reemancipation one year after the incident. Liao later moved to Manila, then Tokyo, in 1950. Liao later founded the Taiwan Democratic Independence Party in Kyoto. On 1 September 1955, he convened the Provisional Congress of the Republic of Formosa in Japan. That same day, Liao issued a declaration of independence for Taiwan. Liao returned to Taiwan on 14 May 1965, stating, "I, Thomas Liao have been working for the interests and happiness of the Taiwanese people overseas for almost 20 years ... But now I recognize from the bottom of my heart that the biggest threat is the infiltration and subversion by the Chinese Communists. Thus, I have renounced my Taiwanese independence activities and have decided to answer the call from President Chiang's Anti-Communist Union, and hereby pledge to do everything within my power to fight for the great cause of defeating the Communists." Chiang Kai-shek granted Liao a full pardon. Shortly after his return, Liao was named founding director of the graduate school of chemical engineering at the College of Chinese Culture by Chang Chi-yun.

Liao died on 9 May 1986.

References

1910 births
1986 deaths
Taiwan independence activists
People from Yunlin County
University of Michigan alumni
Ohio State University College of Engineering alumni
Academic staff of Zhejiang University
Taiwanese exiles
Taiwanese Presbyterians
Taiwanese expatriates in Japan
Taiwanese political party founders
Academic staff of the Chinese Culture University
Taiwanese revolutionaries
20th-century Taiwanese businesspeople
Taiwanese expatriates in the Philippines
Taiwanese politicians of Hakka descent